Rodrigo Fernandes Valete (born March 3, 1978 in Itaporanga, São Paulo), or simply Fernandes, is a retired Brazilian attacking midfielder. He is currently a director at Figueirense, the club he played the most for.

Honors

Santos 
 Torneio Rio-São Paulo: 1997
 Copa Conmebol: 1998

Figueirense 
 Campeonato Catarinense: 1999, 2003, 2004, 2006 e 2008
 Campeonato Brasileiro Série B Runner Up: 2001 e 2010
 Copa do Brasil Runner Up: 2007

Jeonbuk Hyundai Motors FC 
 Korean FA Cup: 2003
 Korean Super Cup: 2004

Individual 
 Copa João Havelange Group Yellow* Top Scorer: 2000  * Equivalent to Campeonato Brasileiro Série B
 Campeonato Catarinense Best Player: 2000 e 2004
 Thomaz Chaves Cabral Medal of Honor: 2009
 King of Florianópolis: 2009
 Ney Pacheco Award: 2011
 Honorary Citizen of Florianópolis: 2012
 City Medal of Honor in Sports - Florianópolis City Council: 2015

References

External links
Fernandes at CBF  

Fernandes at Guardian Stats Centre
Fernandes at Figueirense.com 

1978 births
Living people
Brazilian footballers
Brazilian expatriate footballers
Sport Club Corinthians Paulista players
Santos FC players
Associação Atlética Portuguesa (Santos) players
Figueirense FC players
Sociedade Esportiva Palmeiras players
Jeonbuk Hyundai Motors players
Al Shabab Al Arabi Club Dubai players
Red Bull Brasil players
Campeonato Brasileiro Série A players
K League 1 players
Expatriate footballers in South Korea
Expatriate footballers in the United Arab Emirates
Brazilian expatriate sportspeople in South Korea
Association football midfielders
UAE Pro League players